The Jundiaí River (Portuguese, Rio Jundiaí) is a river of São Paulo state in southeastern Brazil. It is a tributary of the Tietê River, which it joins at Salto after flowing through the city of Jundiaí.

See also
 List of rivers of São Paulo
 Tributaries of the Río de la Plata

References

Brazilian Ministry of Transport

Rivers of São Paulo (state)
Tributaries of the Tietê